The 2000 Hall of Fame Tennis Championships (also known as 2000 Miller Lite Hall of Fame Championships for sponsorship reasons) was a tennis tournament played on grass courts at the International Tennis Hall of Fame in Newport, Rhode Island in the United States and was part of the ATP International Series of the 2000 ATP Tour. It was the 25th edition of the tournament and was held from July 10 through July 16, 2000.

Finals

Singles

 Peter Wessels defeated  Jens Knippschild 7–6(7–3), 6–3
 It was Wessels' only singles title of his career.

Doubles

 Jonathan Erlich /  Harel Levy defeated  Kyle Spencer /  Mitch Sprengelmeyer 7–6(7–2), 7–5

References

External links
 Official website
 ATP tournament profile
 ITF tournament edition details

 
Hall of Fame Championships
Hall of Fame Open
Hall of Fame Tennis Championships
Tennis tournaments in Rhode Island
Hall of Fame Tennis Championships
Hall of Fame Tennis Championships